Silver nitride is an explosive chemical compound with symbol Ag3N. It is a black, metallic-looking solid which is formed when silver oxide or silver nitrate is dissolved in concentrated solutions of ammonia, causing formation of the diammine silver complex which subsequently breaks down to Ag3N. The standard free energy of the compound is about +315 kJ/mol, making it an endothermic compound which decomposes explosively to metallic silver and nitrogen gas.

History
Silver nitride was formerly referred to as fulminating silver, but this can cause confusion with silver fulminate or silver azide, other compounds which have also been referred to by this name. The fulminate and azide compounds do not form from ammoniacal solutions of Ag2O.  Fulminating silver was first prepared in 1788 by the French chemist Claude Louis Berthollet.

Properties
Silver nitride is poorly soluble in water, but decomposes in mineral acids; decomposition is explosive in concentrated acids. It also slowly decomposes in air at room temperature and explodes upon heating to 165 °C.

Hazards
Silver nitride is often produced inadvertently during experiments involving silver compounds and ammonia, leading to surprise detonations. Whether silver nitride is formed depends on the concentration of ammonia in the solution. Silver oxide in 1.52 M ammonia solution readily converts to the nitride, while silver oxide in 0.76 M solution does not form nitride. Silver oxide can also react with dry ammonia to form Ag3N. Silver nitride is more dangerous when dry; dry silver nitride is a contact explosive which may detonate from the slightest touch, even a falling water droplet. It is also explosive when wet, although less so, and explosions do not propagate well in wet deposits of the compound. Because of its long-term instability, undetonated deposits of Ag3N will lose their sensitivity over time.

Silver nitride may appear as black crystals, grains, crusts, or mirrorlike deposits on container walls. Suspected deposits may be dissolved by adding dilute ammonia or concentrated ammonium carbonate solution, removing the explosion hazard.

Other uses of the term
The name "silver nitride" is sometimes also used to describe a reflective coating consisting of alternating thin layers of silver metal and silicon nitride. This material is not explosive, and is not a true silver nitride. It is used to coat mirrors and shotguns.

See also
Silver azide

References

Silver compounds
Nitrides
Explosive chemicals